Alun Davies may refer to:

 Alun Davies (politician) (born 1964), Welsh politician
 Alun Davies (guitarist) (born 1943), guitarist frequently associated with Cat Stevens
 Alun Davies (sailor) (born 1963), Caymanian sailor
 Alun Talfan Davies (1913–2000), Welsh judge and publisher
 Alun Wyn Davies, Welsh rugby union footballer
 Alun Davies (biologist) (born 1955), Welsh biologist
 Alun Davies (historian) (1916–1980), Welsh historian
 Alun Davies (priest) (1923–2003), Welsh Anglican priest
 Alun Herbert Davies (1927–2005), Welsh head teacher and director of the Welsh Books Council

See also
 Alan Davies (disambiguation)
 Alan Davis (disambiguation)
 Al Davies (disambiguation)